The Indochinese spitting cobra (Naja siamensis) (pronounced: nguu hao) also called the Thai spitting cobra, black and white spitting cobra, Siamese spitting cobra, is a species of spitting cobra found in Southeast Asia.

Description
This is a medium-sized elapid, with a more slender build compared to most other cobras within the genus Naja. The body colour of this species is variable from grey to brown to black, with white spots or stripes. The white patterning can be so prolific that it covers the majority of the snake. The highly distinctive black and white colour phase is common in central Thailand, specimens from western Thailand are mostly black, whereas individuals from elsewhere are usually brown. The hood mark can be spectacle-shaped, irregular or missing altogether, especially in adults. Body mass for adults can be tends to be around 1,600 grams. 

This species should not be confused with the monocled cobra (Naja kaouthia), which has similar habitat, size and appearance. Another distinguishing feature is that this species is a "true spitter"; it readily spits venom, but rather than a stream of venom as seen with many other "spitting cobras", this species ejects a "mist" rather than a "stream".

Scalation
There are 25-31 scale rows around the hood, 19-21 just ahead of midbody; 153-174 ventral scales, 45-54 subcaudal scales, and basal pairs are sometimes undivided.

Taxonomy

Naja siamensis is classified under the genus Naja of the family Elapidae. It was first described by Austrian-born Italian zoologist Josephus Nicolaus Laurenti in 1768. The generic name Naja is a Latinisation of the Sanskrit word , meaning "cobra". The specific epithet siamensis is derived from the word Siam or Siamese, which means "relating to or characteristic of Thailand or its people and language". This species was long confused with the monocled cobra (Naja kaouthia) and the Chinese cobra (Naja atra), and extensive variation in pattern and scalation contributed to this confusion. Detailed morphological and molecular analyses revealed it to be a distinct species during the 1990s.

Distribution and habitat
It is found in Southeast Asia, including Thailand, Cambodia, Vietnam, and Laos. May occur in eastern Myanmar but no records are known. It has been reported from Taiwan where it was released to the wild based on folklore Buddhist practices. It occupies a range of habitats including lowlands, hills, plains, and woodland. It can also be found in jungle habitat and it is sometimes attracted to human settlements because of the abundant populations of rodents in and around these areas.

Behavior and diet
It is a primarily nocturnal species. It shows variable temperament depending on the time of day it is encountered. When threatened during daylight hours, the snake is generally timid and seeks refuge in the nearest burrow. However, when the snake is threatened at night, it is more aggressive and is more likely to stand its ground, rear up and display its hood and spit out its venom. If spitting venom doesn't work, it will strike and bite as a last resort. When biting, this species tends to hold on and chew savagely. It usually feeds on rodents, toads, and other snakes.

Reproduction
The snake is oviparous. The female will lay 13-19 eggs 100 days after oviposition. Eggs will hatch after 48 to 70 days depending on the temperature of incubation. Offspring are independent as soon as they have hatched. Hatchlings are anywhere from 12 to 20 cm long and, because they possess fully developed venom delivery systems, should be treated with the same respect as adults. Some hatchlings can be as long as 32 cm.

Venom
Like most other spitting cobras, its venom is primarily a postsynaptic neurotoxin and cytotoxin (necrotizing or tissue-death). Like all cobras, this species shows variation in venom toxicity based on different factors (diet, locality, etc.). In a study of specimens from Thailand, the IV  was 0.28 μg/g (0.18-0.42 μg/g). Fischer and Kabara (1967) listed a value of 0.35 mg/kg via IP route. Another study gave an  range 1.07-1.42 mg/gram of mouse body weight. Bite symptoms include pain, swelling and necrosis around the wound. The bite of this snake is potentially lethal to an adult human. Deaths, which generally happen due to paralysis and consequent asphyxiation, mainly occur in rural areas where the procurement of antivenin is difficult.

If the snake spits venom into the eyes of an individual, the individual will experience immediate and severe pain as well as temporary and sometimes even permanent blindness.

Cases
In a national hospital based survey of snakes responsible for bites in Thailand, 10% of all dead snakes brought by snake-bitten patients were of this species (described as "Naja atra northern spitting cobra"). Neurotoxic signs (ptosis and difficulty in breathing) were observed in 12 of the 114 cases (10.5%). Local swelling and necrosis were common, but many of the patients were followed up for too short a time to allow precise assessment of the incidence of these effects. Swelling and necrosis, comparable in all respects with that following bites by N. kaouthia, in patients envenomed by N. siamensis in Ubon and Kanchanaburi in Thailand.

References

Naja
Snakes of Myanmar
Reptiles of Cambodia
Reptiles of Laos
Snakes of Thailand
Reptiles described in 1768
Snakes of Vietnam